"Love Song" is a power ballad written by Frank Hannon and Jeff Keith of the rock band Tesla, originally released on their 1989 album The Great Radio Controversy. The song reached number 10 on the Billboard Hot 100. It also became a gold record.

Music video
On July 7, 1989, the music video was filmed during a concert in the band's home town of Sacramento at the former Cal Expo amphitheater. KRXQ (93 Rock), a local rock radio station at the time, was aware that the music video was to be filmed at the concert. The station held a contest awarding backstage passes to the fan who created the best banner that displayed "93 Rock", "Tesla", and "Love Song". Banners can be seen being held up in the audience and background throughout the video.

Track listing

Charts

Weekly charts

Year-end charts

Certifications

References

1989 singles
1980s ballads
1989 songs
Tesla (band) songs
Sacramento Kings
Geffen Records singles
Glam metal ballads